The Frøken Norge 2007 beauty pageant was held in Lillestrøm, Norway on 9 April 2007. 12 finalists out of about 2200 applicants were competing the final night for the two crowns.

The eventual two winners were Lisa-Mari Moen Jünge from Molde – Frøken Norge for Miss World – chosen by public voting, who represented Norway in Miss World 2007 in China; and the half-Filipina former Miss Intercontinental finalist from Oslo, Kirby Ann Basken – Frøken Norge for Miss Universe – chosen by the judges, who represented Norway in Miss Universe 2007 in Mexico.

Final results

Judges
Kathrine Sørland (former Miss Norway, model and TV presenter)
Runar Søgaard (leadership trainer and life coach)
Kristin Spitznogle (psychologist/sexologist)
Zahid Ali (comedian)
Pat Sharp (British radio and TV presenter)
Trude Mostue (celebrity veterinary surgeon)
Lise Nilsen (former model)
Marius Kopperud (radio presenter)
Marita Niska (salesperson)
Geir Lillejord (drag queen)

References

Miss Norway
2007 beauty pageants
2007 in Norway